The Albin Countergambit is a chess opening that begins with the moves:
1. d4 d5
2. c4 e5

and the usual continuation is:

3. dxe5 d4

The opening is a gambit and an uncommon response to the Queen's Gambit. In exchange for the sacrificed pawn, Black has a central wedge at d4 and gets some chances for an attack. Often White will try to return the pawn at an opportune moment to gain a  advantage.

In the Encyclopaedia of Chess Openings the Albin Countergambit is assigned codes D08 and D09.

History 
Although this opening was originally played by Cavallotti against Salvioli at the Milan tournament of 1881, it takes its name from Adolf Albin, who played it against Emanuel Lasker in New York 1893. Though it is not played frequently at the master level, Russian grandmaster Alexander Morozevich made some successful use of it in the 2000s.

Main line 

The main line continues 4.Nf3 Nc6 (4...c5 allows 5.e3 because Black no longer has the bishop check) and now White's primary options are 5.a3, 5.Nbd2, and 5.g3. Perhaps White's surest try for an advantage is to  their king bishop with 5.g3 followed by Bg2 and Nbd2. Black will often castle . A typical continuation is 5.g3 Be6 6.Nbd2 Qd7 7.Bg2 0-0-0 8.0-0 Bh3.

Variations

Lasker Trap 

The black pawn on d4 is stronger than it may appear. After 3.dxe5 d4 the careless move 4.e3 can lead to the Lasker Trap. After 4...Bb4+ 5.Bd2 dxe3 6.Bxb4 is a blunder—Black plays 6...exf2+ 7.Ke2 fxg1=N+ and Black's position is superior. The Lasker Trap is notable because it features a rare instance of an underpromotion in practical play.

Spassky Variation 
In the Spassky Variation, White avoids the Lasker Trap by advancing 4.e4. Although Black can capture en passant with 4...dxe3, the Lasker Trap depends on Black capturing the e-pawn after 4...Bb4+ 5.Bd2, which is not possible here. According to Minev, after 4.e4? Nc6! Black will have the better game.

See also
 List of chess openings
 List of chess openings named after people

References 

Bibliography

 Adolf Albin and the Genesis of the Albin Counter Gambit Part I, O. G. Urcan, chesscafe.com
 Adolf Albin and the Genesis of the Albin Counter Gambit Part II, O. G. Urcan, chesscafe.com

External links 

Albin Counter Gambit Bibliography

Chess openings
1881 in chess